DEX New York Cosmetics, Inc. is an American cosmetics company that specializes in mineral make-up without the use of mica or bismuth oxychloride as its base.  Its product line includes DEX New York Cosmetics, as well as like-branded make-up applicators and accessories.  Its corporate headquarters is located in New York - the cross roads of Fifth Avenue and East 57th Street.

History 

Trinidad-born Dexter Phillip, a fashion consultant by trade, founded DEX New York in March 2008 together with partner Daniel Padnos.  It consists of his mineral cosmetics line and a private beauty-and-photography studio in 65th Street in downtown Manhattan.  The company moved its studio to a 750-square-foot space in Fifth Avenue in 2010, with Lady Gaga as their first client.  The new studio is meant to be exclusive, as it can only accommodate two clients at a time and does not have a street-side window to ward off paparazzi.
Meanwhile, DEX New York Cosmetics has expanded into over 120 products, including mineral-based skin products, powders, eye shadows, lipsticks, and sunless tanner.

References

External links 

Chemical companies established in 2008
Cosmetics companies of the United States
Privately held companies based in New York City
2008 establishments in New York City